Santhu is a village in Jalore in Jalor) district of Marwar region in Rajasthan state of India.

Before independence, half of the village was under the Jagir of Shingiji, of the Jodhpur Royal family and the remaining half was in the Jagiri of Pharapura Thakur's family.

People
Santhu has a population of 8343 (2001 census).

Facts
Its nearby railway station names are Marwar Bagra and Bakra Road and is on the Samadari-Bhildi section of North Western Railway. The conversion of the meter gauge rail route to broad gauge has been completed and direct trains from Mumbai have started running on this route to Bikaner via Jodhpur.

Santhu is well connected to all nearby towns by all weather roads. Buses ply through Bagra to all major places. Taxis are available at all times for nearby places from Santhu, Bakra Road and Bagra.

Distances
Nearest Air ports:
 Jodhpur 165 km
 Udaipur 195 km

Nearest Air strips:
 Noon (Nun) 12 km
 Sirohi 60 km
 Abu Road 130 km
 Deesa

By Road:
 Santhu to Jalore ,
 Santhu to Bhinmal ,
 Santhu to Jodhpur ,
 Santhu to Ahmedabad ,
 Santhu to Sirohi ,
 Santhu to Sirohi Road ,
 Santhu to Abu Road ,
 Santhu to Mount Abu ,
 Santhu to Jaisalmer ,
 Santhu to Ranakpur ,
 Santhu to Kheteshwar Brahmadham Tirtha kshetra Asotra 125 km
 Santhu to Kunwarda 50 km
 Santhu to Dudsi 10 km
 Santhu to Ramdevji Ka Mandir Bagra road 1 km

Economy
Agriculture and animal husbandry are main occupations of the people of Santhu. Santhu is a major production centre of cash crops like oilseeds, isabgol, jeera, and arandi in Jalore district. In last decade many entrepreneurs have set up small scale granite units in nearby towns Bagra, Marwar and Jalore.

Amenities
 For primary medicinal first aid there is a government primary hospital on Bagra Road constructed and maintained by Shri Pavnibai Kapurchandji Pratapji Charitable Trust, Chennai with aid provided by government.
 The facility for first aid for cattle and animals is provided in the government veterinarian hospital of the village.
 The good governance is provided by the elected Panchayat Samiti of the village.
 The nearby police station is situated in Bagra, Marwar.
 The post and telegraph office of the village provides all sort of postal facilities.
 The banking facility is provided by MGB Gramin Bank, Santhu.
 There is a separate community hall known as Rajpurohits Kotadi maintained by the large Rajpurohit community of the village.

Special
 Shri Apeshwar Mahadev Gaushala set up in 2000 in the outskirts of the village, a shelter for cows. The Gaushala take care of the cows with public donation.
 Beautifully built Shri Apeshwar Mahadev Kabtoor Chowk in sandstone, a place for feeding pigeons and other birds is another place of charity run by the people of the village.
 A well, known as Somiyo Ro Kuo, was the main source of water supply in the village in olden days. It has recently been renovated and an additional bore well was also dug with public donations. It also acts as a drinking water facility for animals that pass by. Nowadays, Panchayat has provided water supply through pipelines with a good quality of drinking water.
 The good communication facility of basic telephone services along with good mobile network is provided by the government company BSNL and almost all other private companies.

Places of interest
Shri Munisuvrata-Nemi-Parshva Jinalaya
This is a Jain temple. Its principal deities are Shri Munisuvrata Swami (twentieth Tirthankara), Neminatha (twenty-second Tirthankara) and Parshvanatha (twenty-third Tirthankara).

Gallery

Villages in Jalore district